This is a list of Swedish governments and rulers, from the end of the Kalmar Union until the breakthrough of parliamentarism.

1521-1523 : Regent Gustaf Eriksson Vasa (Continued as king)
1523-1560 : King Gustaf I of Sweden
1560-1568 : King Eric XIV of Sweden
1568-1592 : King John III of Sweden
1592-1599 : King Sigismund of Sweden
1599-1604 : Duke Charles (Continued as king)
1604-1611 : King Charles IX of Sweden
1611-1632 : King Gustav Adolphus the Great
1632-1644 : Chancellor Axel Oxenstierna, leader of government under the minority of the monarch
1644-1654 : Queen Christina of Sweden
1654-1660 : King Charles X Gustav of Sweden
1660-1672 : Privy Council, government under the minority of the monarch
1672-1697 : King Charles XI of Sweden
1697-1697 : Privy Council, government under the minority of the monarch
1697-1718 : King Charles XII of Sweden
1718-1738 : Chancellery President Arvid Horn, leader of a Cap Party government
1738-1765 : Parliamentary rule with a Hat Party government
1765-1769 : Parliamentary rule with a Cap Party government
1769-1772 : Parliamentary rule with a Hat Party government
1772-1792 : King Gustaf III of Sweden, enlightened despotism
1792-1792 : Regent Duke Charles, leader of government under the minority of the monarch
1792-1796 : Gustaf Adolf Reuterholm, leader of government under the minority of the monarch
1796-1809 : King Gustaf IV Adolf of Sweden
1809-1810 : Parliamentary rule
1810-1818 : Regent Crown Prince Charles (Continued as king)
1818-1844 : King Charles XIV of Sweden
1844-1857 : King Oscar I of Sweden
1857-1859 : Regent Crown Prince Charles (Continued as king)
1859-1872 : King Charles XV of Sweden
1872-1907 : King Oscar II of Sweden

The post of Prime Minister of Sweden was introduced in 1876 and continued to rise in importance until the breakthrough of parliamentarism in the 1910s. King Gustaf V of Sweden acceded to the throne in 1907 and became the last king that tried to influence government politics in 1914. In 1921 universal suffrage was introduced and Sweden achieved full parliamentary democracy.

See also 
List of Swedish monarchs
List of cabinets of Sweden
State leaders by year
Politics of Sweden
Constitution of Sweden
Riksdag

Governments
Sweden
Governments
Political history of Sweden